Anil Dave may refer to:

 Anil Madhav Dave (1956–2017), Indian environmentalist and politician
 Anil R. Dave (born 1951), Indian judge